A large number of canals were built in Cheshire, England, during the early phases of the Industrial Revolution to transport goods and raw materials.  This resulted in a significant canal network which is now enjoyed by holiday-makers, anglers, walkers, and others.

Routes of navigable canals

Bridgewater Canal

The Bridgewater Canal runs from Preston Brook, near Runcorn, to Leigh in Greater Manchester. The original section of the canal starts at Castlefield Basin in Manchester city centre where it joins the Rochdale Canal. It then passes Hulme Lock, an unused connection to the River Irwell and the Manchester Ship Canal, and a new lock at Pomona which accesses the Ship Canal.

At Preston Brook, the canal connects with the Trent and Mersey Canal.

Trent and Mersey Canal

The Trent and Mersey Canal links the River Trent at Derwent Mouth (in Derbyshire) to the River Mersey. The second connection is made via the Bridgewater Canal, which it joins at Preston Brook in Cheshire. Although mileposts measure the distance to Preston Brook and Shardlow, Derwent Mouth is a mile or so beyond Shardlow.

Peak Forest Canal

The Peak Forest Canal runs from a junction with the Ashton Canal at the southern end of the Tame Aqueduct at Dukinfield through Newton, Hyde, Woodley, Bredbury, Romiley, Marple, Strines, Disley, New Mills, Furness Vale, and Bridgemont. It terminates at Bugsworth Basin, and there is a short branch at Bridgemont to Whaley Bridge.

At Marple, the canal crosses Marple Aqueduct and then rises through 16 locks and makes a junction at Top Lock with the Macclesfield Canal.

Wardle Canal

The Wardle Canal is located in Middlewich, Cheshire, and connects the Trent and Mersey Canal to the Shropshire Union Canal (Middlewich branch).

Macclesfield Canal

The Macclesfield Canal runs  from Marple Junction where it joins the Peak Forest Canal, southwards (through Bollington, Macclesfield, and Congleton), to a junction with the Trent and Mersey Canal near Kidsgrove.

Shropshire Union Canal

The Shropshire Union Canal links Wolverhampton (and the Birmingham Canal Navigations) with the River Mersey.

History

The Bridgewater Canal is often considered to be the first true canal in Britain. However, the Sankey Canal also has good claim to that title.  Although the Sankey Canal was originally contained within the old county of Lancashire, the transfer of Warrington and Widnes to Cheshire means that it now lies partly in the county.  Preston Brook also lies in Cheshire, south of the River Mersey.

Opening dates
Where possible, opening dates for the entire length have been used.  Otherwise the date indicates when the Act of Parliament was granted.

 1721 – River Weaver (canalised)
 1757 – Sankey Brook Navigation – Engineer Henry Berry and William Taylor,
 1761 – Bridgewater Canal – Engineer James Brindley
 1772 – Chester Canal
 1777 – Trent and Mersey Canal – Engineer James Brindley
 1796 – Ashton Canal
 1800 – Peak Forest Canal – Engineer Benjamin Outram and Thomas Brown
 1804 – Rochdale Canal
 1829 – Wardle Canal
 1831 – Macclesfield Canal
 1835 – Shropshire Union Canal – Engineer Thomas Telford and others
 1894 – Manchester Ship Canal – Engineers Edward Leader Williams

List of canals in Cheshire
The following is an incomplete list of canals (or navigable rivers) which pass (at least in part) through Cheshire:

 Trent and Mersey Canal
 Shropshire Union Canal
 Macclesfield Canal
 Ellesmere Canal
 Llangollen Canal
 Chester Canal
 Manchester Ship Canal
 River Weaver
 Rochdale Canal
 Ashton Canal
 Peak Forest Canal
 Bridgewater Canal
 Cheshire Ring
 Wardle Canal

Structures found on canals

 Anderton Boat Lift
 Red Bull Aqueduct
 Marple Lock Flight

The Cheshire Ring

The Cheshire Ring is a popular canal cruise which includes six of the canals in Cheshire. Because it takes approximately a week to complete, it is suited to narrowboat holidays which  start and return to the same location. It is  popular because it offers a contrast between the city centre of Manchester, views of the Peak District, and the Cheshire Plain.

See also

Geography of England
Transport in England
Transport in the United Kingdom
History of the British canal system

References

 
Transport in Cheshire